Eryk Rocha (born Erik Aruak Gaítán Rocha, January 19, 1978) is a Brazilian film director, producer, editor, and cinematographer. He is the son of film director Glauber Rocha.

Education and early career 
He studied cinema at the San Antonio de Los Baños School in Cuba, where he produced Rocha que voa (2002)." It won best film in the É Tudo Verdade International Festival, the CineSul Festival, and the Saul Yelín Choir at the New Latin American Cinema Festival in Havana in 2002. The film also won the title of Best Masterpiece at the Rosário Festival in Argentina in 2003.

Filmography

As director 
 El Aula Vacía (2015) co-director with 10 others; documentary produced by Gael García Bernal
 Campo de Jogo (2014) documentary; English title Sunday Ball
 Transeunte (2010)
 Pachamama (2008)
 Quimera (2005)
 Stones in the Sky (2002) documentary

As writer 
 Campo de Jogo
 Transeunte
 Pachamama
 Stones in the Sky

As producer 
 Campo de Jogo
 Rocha que voa (2002)

As cinematographer 
 Undertow Eyes (2009) short film
 Pachamama

References

External links 
 

1978 births
Brazilian film directors
Living people
People from Brasília